Sir David Lance Crouch (23 June 1919 – 18 February 1998) was a British Conservative politician.

Crouch was educated at University College School, London and became a marketing consultant.  He contested Leeds West in 1959, and served as Member of Parliament for Canterbury from 1966 until he retired in 1987.
The awarding of his knighthood was announced shortly after he stood down as an MP.

Personal life

Crouch married Margaret Noakes in 1947. They had a son, sculptor Patrick Crouch, and a daughter. He died in Faversham, Kent, on 18 February 1998, aged 78.

References

Sources
The Times Guide to the House of Commons, Times Newspapers Ltd, 1966
 Notice, thegazette.co.uk. Accessed 8 January 2023.

Obituary, independent.co.uk. Accessed 8 January 2023.

"ARTIST Patrick Crouch has completed a stone sculpture for outside Kent University’s Reg­istry. The 8ft tall piece was un­veiled by the university’s former vice-chan­cellor David Melville.", pressreader.com. Accessed 8 January 2023.

External links 
 

1919 births
1998 deaths
Conservative Party (UK) MPs for English constituencies
Knights Bachelor
UK MPs 1966–1970
UK MPs 1970–1974
UK MPs 1974
UK MPs 1974–1979
UK MPs 1979–1983
UK MPs 1983–1987
People educated at University College School
Politics of Canterbury